Geppetto is a 2000 made-for-television musical remake of the popular 1883 Italian children's book The Adventures of Pinocchio by Carlo Collodi starring Drew Carey and Julia Louis-Dreyfus. While not a direct adaptation of the 1940 animated film, it features a few elements such as the character of Figaro, the "I've Got No Strings" song as well as Pleasure Island. It features original songs written by Stephen Schwartz. Schwartz had developed the songs as a reunion for stars Julie Andrews and Dick Van Dyke, but Andrews was undergoing throat surgery so the idea was dropped.

Plot
Geppetto (Drew Carey) is a kind toymaker who desperately wishes to become a father. One night, after selling his new spring toys to the children of Villagio, his wish is granted by the Blue Fairy (Julia Louis-Dreyfus), who brings his wooden puppet, Pinocchio (Seth Adkins), to life with her magic saying that someday, if he proves himself brave, truthful and unselfish, he will become a real boy.

At first, Geppetto is delighted to have his wish come true, but runs into a string of problems, such as Pinocchio asking unnecessary questions when trying to get to sleep, getting into mischief and wandering off when introducing him to the townspeople, and showing no interest in being a toymaker. The next day, Geppetto sends Pinocchio off to school, telling him to just act like all the other children and he will do fine. However, Pinocchio gets into a fight at school, in which he was imitating all the other children. A disappointed Geppetto takes him home where an unsuccessful puppeteer named Stromboli (Brent Spiner) becomes interested, thinking he would make him a fortune in his puppet shows. Still furious about Pinocchio's misbehavior, Geppetto tries to reason with the Blue Fairy, but she does not believe him. He returns home to apologize to Pinocchio, only to find out he ran away to live with Stromboli. Geppetto decides to say goodbye to Pinocchio by watching him perform in Stromboli's puppet show.

Stromboli is pleased with Pinocchio as his star puppet which has made him much money. But when Pinocchio asks to let him go, Stromboli refuses, stating it would violate a contract they signed. When Geppetto arrives backstage, hoping to say goodbye, Stromboli explains that Pinocchio left after the show, claiming that he wanted to see the world. After he leaves, Stromboli is outraged when he notices that Pinocchio escaped from the cage and spots him boarding a stagecoach to Pleasure Island. He decides to recapture him while Geppetto goes out to rescue him as well, with the Blue Fairy following him, attempting to assist him in his quest. Along the way, he meets an inept magician named Lezarno (Wayne Brady) and Professor Buonragazzo (René Auberjonois) who lives in the town of Idyllia, where he and his son make perfect and ideal children who always obey their parents. Geppetto and Stromboli both arrive at Pleasure Island where Geppetto finds out all the boys turn into donkeys after riding a rollercoaster. But because adults are not allowed in Pleasure Island, Stromboli is kicked out while Geppetto arrives just in time to take Pinocchio home, but Pinocchio refuses, saying he did not want him because of what a big disappointment he was to him and immediately turns into a donkey once he gets on the rollercoaster and is shipped off to sea by boat.

Trying to keep up with the boat, Geppetto accidentally gets swallowed by a monstrous whale. Pinocchio jumps off the boat and into the water where he gets swallowed by the whale as well and the donkey curse washes away. They make up and, noticing that they are inside the whale, they attempt to get out by having Pinocchio tell several lies, causing his nose to grow and tickle the whale's uvula to throw them up. Afterwards, they return to the toy shop where Stromboli arrives to take Pinocchio back, still keeping him under the contract. Geppetto offers him his whole shop in exchange for Pinocchio. As Stromboli captures him, Geppetto begs and pleads to the Blue Fairy, who can no longer help, to grant him one last wish. The Blue Fairy then turns Pinocchio into a real boy, shoos Stromboli away with her magic, and changes the words on the sign of Geppetto's shop to "Geppetto & Son".

Cast
 Drew Carey as Geppetto
 Julia Louis-Dreyfus as The Blue Fairy
 Brent Spiner as Stromboli
 René Auberjonois as Professor Buonragazzo
 Seth Adkins as Pinocchio
 Usher as Pleasure Island Ringmaster
 Ana Gasteyer as Signora Giovanni
 Wayne Brady as Lezarno
 Anthony Crivello as Bernardo
 Christopher Marquette as Buonragazzo Junior 
 Renee Olstead as Perfect Child
 Teresa Parente as Maria
 Janel Parrish as Natalie
 Anton Yelchin as Fighting Kid at School
 Patti Cohenour as Featured Performer
 Jonathan Dokuchitz as Featured Performer
 Jason Graae as Featured Performer
 Myles Jeffrey as Featured Performer
 Kristin Klabunde as Featured Performer
 Kyme as Featured Performer
 Tessa Ludwick as Featured Performer
 Paige Miller as Featured Performer
 Sara Paxton as Featured Performer
 Tiler Peck as Featured Performer
 Scarlett Pomers as Featured Performer
 Mark Saul as Featured Performer
 Kyle Sullivan as Featured Performer
 Arnetia Walker as Featured Performer
 Camille Winbush as Featured Performer
 Josh Zuckerman as Featured Performer
 Grover Dale as Featured Performer
 Aaron Spann as Resident of Idyllia
 Kane Hodder as Pleasure Island Inhabitant
 Jack Salvatore Jr. as Pleasure Island Inhabitant

Musical numbers
 "Once Upon a Time" – Geppetto
 "Toys" – Geppetto and Jillian, town children, parents 
 "Empty Heart" – Geppetto
 "Geppetto and Son" – Geppetto, Pinocchio
 "Just Because It's Magic" – Blue Fairy, Geppetto
 "I've Got No Strings" – Pinocchio
 "Bravo, Stromboli!" – Stromboli
 "Toys" (Reprise) – Geppetto, Lezarno
 "Satisfaction Guaranteed" – Professor Buonragazzo, Buonragazzo Jr., Idyllia residents
 "Just Because It's Magic" (Reprise) – Blue Fairy
 "Pleasure Island" – Ringmaster
 "And Son" (Whale Reprise) – Pinocchio, Geppetto and Jillian 
 "Since I Gave My Heart Away" – Geppetto, and Jillian Blue Fairy, townspeople and their kids 
 "Since I Gave My Heart Away" (Single Version) Jillian Reubens perform by  

The soundtrack for Geppetto is available from Walt Disney Records, and it features songs from the film composed by Stephen Schwartz, as well as the single, "Since I Gave My Heart Away" performed by Sonya Isaacs (as heard in the end credits of the movie).

Jerry Mitchell was the film's choreographer.

Home media

Walt Disney Home Video released the film on VHS on May 30, 2000. It was later released to DVD on September 26 of that year, and subsequently reissued on January 13, 2009.

Stage
In 2006, Geppetto was adapted into a stage musical and renamed Disney's My Son Pinocchio: Geppetto's Musical Tale.

Awards

 Nominated for four Emmy Awards in 2000:
 Outstanding Art Direction for a Miniseries, Movie or a Special
 Outstanding Costumes for a Miniseries, Movie or a Special
 Outstanding Hairstyling for a Miniseries
 Outstanding Makeup for a Miniseries, Movie or a Special
 Winner of the 2001 Costume Designers Guild Awards for Excellence in Costume Design for Television - Period/Fantasy
 Winner of two Hollywood Makeup Artist and Hair Stylist Guild Awards in 2001
 Best Period Makeup - Television (for a Mini-Series/Motion Picture Made for Television
 Best Special Makeup Effects - Television (for a Mini-Series/Motion Picture Made for Television)
 Seth Adkins won the 2000 YoungStar Award for Best Young Actor/Performance in a Miniseries/Made-For-TV Film

References

External links
 
 

Pinocchio films
2000 films
2000 television films
2000s musical fantasy films
American musical fantasy films
American television films
Disney film remakes
Pinocchio (1940 film)
Television remakes of films
Films directed by Tom Moore
2000s English-language films
2000s American films